Pomeroy Tucker (August 10, 1802 – June 30, 1870) was a journalist and New York politician.

Born in Palmyra, New York, in 1802, Tucker served an apprenticeship as a printer in Palmyra, became a contributor to the Canandaigua Messenger, and in 1823 established the Wayne Sentinel as a Democratic organ. He was elected as the Wayne County representative to the New York State Assembly in 1837, and was for several years postmaster, and at one time a canal collector.

Tucker was employed as a printer for a time by E. B. Grandin, known for publishing the first order of the Book of Mormon, a sacred text of the churches of the Latter Day Saint movement. Tucker, by his own account "well acquainted" with Joseph Smith, his family, and "most of the early followers of Smith," was suspicious of Smith and the origins of  Mormonism, and subsequently authored Origin, Rise, and Progress of Mormonism in 1867, a book considered to have been the "most influential anti-Mormon work in [its] period."

Tucker died on June 30, 1870.

Works

References

External links

1802 births
1870 deaths
19th-century American newspaper editors
19th-century American newspaper publishers (people)
American printers
Critics of Mormonism
Democratic Party members of the New York State Assembly
New York (state) postmasters
People from Palmyra, New York
American male journalists
19th-century American male writers
19th-century American politicians